The Cumberland Law Review is a law review published by the students at Cumberland School of Law in Birmingham, Alabama.

Founded in 1970, the Review publishes two issues a year, with each issue averaging between 150 and 200 pages. Each issue consists of any combination of tributes, articles, essays, notes, and comments. Generally, an issue includes at least one article, note, and comment. Occasionally, part of an issue or an entire issue is devoted to a single topic. For instance, in 2016 the Review published a symposium on Harper Lee's books "Go Set a Watchman" and "To Kill a Mockingbird." The Review's online companion, the Cumberland Review Online, publishes shorter pieces surveying recent developments with the Supreme Court of Alabama and United States Court of Appeals for the Eleventh Circuit.

Membership 
Membership on the Cumberland Law Review is available to those students in the top fifteen percent of  the  1L  class,  determined  at  the  close  of  the  second  semester,  who  successfully  complete a write-on competition, known as the Candidates Program, consisting of a Bluebook examination and casenote submission. A student must successfully complete both phases to become a member of the Review. Members of the Review's editorial staff perform cite checks, attend mandatory meetings, write surveys tracking legal developments, and submit a comment for publication consideration.

Submissions 
The Cumberland Law Review considers articles, essays, notes, and comments from professionals and professors with a law degree for both its print and online publications. Individuals who wish to submit a piece for publication should consult the Review's website for specific submission instructions.

Symposium 
The Cumberland Law Review hosts an annual symposium inviting judges, attorneys, and professors to discuss certain topics of interest and importance to the practicing bar. For example, on November 17, 2016, The Review successfully hosted its symposium, Alcohol in Alabama.  The event was held at Cahaba Brewing Company in Birmingham and featured speakers on the topics of Dram Shop Act liability, DUI, and alcohol regulation. Other recent symposium topics have included automatic & appellate advocacy, practical tips from behind the bench, alternative dispute resolution & advocacy, and practical considerations for a tech reliant legal industry.

External links

References 

American law journals
Samford University
General law journals